Jacob Jacobsen (1901-1996) was a Norwegian designer and founder of Luxo ASA.

Biography
Starting in 1921, Jacobsen worked in the textile industry. In 1934 he founded Luxo ASA, former Jac. Jacobsen A / S, a Norwegian industrial group. It was originally a marketing company for textile machinery. In 1937, he developed the Luxo-L1, a balanced-arm lamp. Today, the lamp is part of various exhibitions in museums around the world, as the lamp is being seen as an example for classic lamp design. The L1 construction principle is based on the Anglepoise lamp, developed by George Carwardine in 1933. Jacob  Jacobsen lived to be 95 years old and was active in the company until his last days.

Today the Luxo Group forms part of the Glamox Group. It  consists of 14 sales companies and production units, located in 10 countries  in both Europe and North America. The head-office is located in Oslo, Norway.

Trivia
The animation film Luxo Jr.  by Pixar features the Luxo-L1. It is the source of the small hopping desk lamp included in Pixar's corporate logo.

References

External links
Luxo ASA website

1901 births
1996 deaths
Norwegian designers